Nándor Hidegkuti (3 March 1922 – 14 February 2002) was a Hungarian football player and manager. He played as a forward or attacking midfielder and spent the majority of his playing career at MTK Hungária FC.  During the 1950s he was also a key member of the Hungarian National Team team known as the Golden Team. Other members of the team included Ferenc Puskás, Zoltán Czibor, Sándor Kocsis and József Bozsik. In 1953, playing as a deep lying centre-forward, a position which has retroactively been compared to the modern false 9 role, he scored a hat-trick for Hungary when they beat England 6–3 at Wembley Stadium. Playing from deep, Hidegkuti was able to distribute the ball to the other attackers and cause considerable confusion to defences. This was an innovation at the time and revolutionised the way the game was played.

Hidegkuti died on 14 February 2002 after suffering from heart and lung problems for some time before his death. MTK Hungária FC renamed their stadium, Hidegkuti Nándor Stadium in his honour.

Club career
Hidegkuti started his career in Elektromos FC and Herminamezei AC.

MTK Budapest
Hidegkuti began playing for MTK in 1947. In 1949 when Hungary became a communist state, MTK were taken over by the secret police, the ÁVH and subsequently the club changed their name several times. Initially they became Textiles SE, then Bástya SE, then Vörös Lobogó SE and then finally back to MTK.  Despite this turmoil, the 1950s proved a successful era for club and it was while at MTK that Hidegkuti, together with Péter Palotás and coach Márton Bukovi, pioneered the deep lying centre-forward position. With a team that also included Mihály Lantos and József Zakariás, MTK and Hidegkuti won three Hungarian League titles, a Hungarian Cup and a Mitropa Cup. In 1955, as Vörös Lobogó SE, they also played in the first ever European Cup. Hidegkuti scored twice as they beat RSC Anderlecht 10–4 on aggregate in the first round. After retiring as a player, Hidegkuti also had two spells as a coach at MTK.

International career

Between 1945 and 1958 Hidegkuti earned 69 appearances and scored 39 goals for Hungary. He scored twice on his debut on 30 September 1945 in a 7–2 win against Romania. Two years later, on 17 August 1947, he made his second international appearance and scored a hat-trick against Bulgaria. On 18 November 1951 he scored another hat trick against Finland.  He became a central player in the Golden Team of the early and mid-1950s; during this time, Ferenc Puskás, Sándor Kocsis and Hidegkuti provided the Hungarians a total of 198 goals.

Hidegkuti was used by the Golden Team as a deep lying centre-forward. In the 1950s, the majority of international sides still used the WM formation, where the defending centre half would traditionally mark the opposition's centre forward – usually whoever was wearing the number 9 shirt. When a defending centre half attempted to mark Hidegkuti, they were drawn out of position, allowing the rest of the Hungarian team to exploit the space. At the time this was a revolutionary tactic, requiring the player in the deep lying centre-forward position to have excellent ball control, distribution skills and positional awareness.

Former England and Leeds United manager, Don Revie paid tribute to the influence of Hidegkuti in his autobiography: "In the summer of 1954 England and Scotland were knocked out of the World Cup series in Switzerland. That competition was won by Germany, but dominated by Hungary, who played with a deep-lying centre forward, Nandor Hidegkuti. Alongside him; Sandor Koscis and Ferenc Puskas, two of the greatest inside-forwards in the world. But whatever people claim of Koscis and Puskas, it was the man Hidegkuti who tore the England defence to shreds at Wembley in November 1953. It was Hidegkuti, again playing his hide-and-seek centre-forward game, who shattered England in the return match in Budapest in May 1954, when we were thrashed 7–1." Sepp Herberger, manager of the West German team that would defeat Hungary in the 1954 World Cup final, identified Hidegkuti as the most important player in the Hungarian team (despite Puskas drawing a lot more public attention) and adjusted his tactics for the final to prevent him from playing out his game.

Managerial career
As a manager Hidegkuti coached clubs in Hungary, Italy, Poland and Egypt. In 1961 he guided Fiorentina to victory in the first ever European Cup Winners' Cup, beating Rangers 4–1 on aggregate in the final. With Győri ETO he won the Hungarian League in 1963 and then took them to the semi-final of the 1964–65 European Cup where they lost to eventual runners-up, Benfica. In Egypt, Hidegkuti coached Al Ahly, introducing a 5–3–2 formation.

For his model behaviour as a player and coach, he was awarded the 1993 FIFA Fair Play Award.

Honours

Player
MTK Hungária
Hungarian Champions: 1951, 1953, 1958
Hungarian Cup: 1952
Mitropa Cup: 1955

Hungary
 Olympic Gold Medalist: 1952
 Central European Champion: 1953
 FIFA World Cup runner-up: 1954

Individual
 Hungarian Football Federation Player of the Year: 1953
 FIFA World Cup All-Star Team: 1954

Manager
Fiorentina
European Cup Winners' Cup: 1960–61

Győri ETO FC
Hungarian Champions: 1963
European Cup: semi-finalist 1964–65
Hungarian Cup: 1965, 1966, 1967

Al-Ahly
Egyptian Premier League: 1975, 1976, 1977, 1979, 1980
Egypt Cup: 1978

Notes

See also 
 List of men's footballers with 500 or more goals

References

Sources
Behind The Curtain – Travels in Eastern European Football: Jonathan Wilson (2006)

External links
 Hungary stats at Rsssf
 Hungary stats
 UEFA obituary
Observer obituary by Rogan Taylor
Nándor Hidegkuti, Sports-Reference/Olympics. Retrieved 2019-02-25.

1922 births
2002 deaths
Hungarian footballers
Hungary international footballers
MTK Budapest FC players
Hungarian football managers
Győri ETO FC managers
FC Tatabánya managers
MTK Budapest FC managers
ACF Fiorentina managers
Footballers at the 1952 Summer Olympics
Olympic footballers of Hungary
Olympic gold medalists for Hungary
1954 FIFA World Cup players
1958 FIFA World Cup players
Footballers from Budapest
Expatriate football managers in Egypt
Expatriate football managers in Italy
Olympic medalists in football
Stal Rzeszów managers
Medalists at the 1952 Summer Olympics
Association football forwards
Nemzeti Bajnokság I players
Al Ahly SC managers
Nemzeti Bajnokság I managers
Al Ahli Club (Dubai) managers
Hungarian expatriate sportspeople in the United Arab Emirates
Hungarian expatriate sportspeople in Italy
Expatriate football managers in the United Arab Emirates